Cap'n Jazz (sometimes stylised as caP'n Jazz) was an American emo band formed in Chicago in 1989 by brothers Tim and Mike Kinsella, who were joined by Sam Zurick and Victor Villarreal. After a number of name changes and the addition of guitarist Davey von Bohlen, the band began to earn a cult following in the Chicago area and the Midwest.

History
Cap'n Jazz recorded several singles for independent labels in the early 90s as well as contributing to several compilations.

In 1995, the band released its only full-length album, Burritos, Inspiration Point, Fork Balloon Sports, Cards in the Spokes, Automatic Biographies, Kites, Kung Fu, Trophies, Banana Peels We've Slipped On and Egg Shells We've Tippy Toed Over on the Man with Gun label. The album is sometimes referred to as Shmap'n Shmazz, which was printed on top of the CD release.

The band broke up in July 1995, shortly after Shmap'n Shmazz's release, on the night of a show at Little Rock's Das Yutes a Go-Go. In 1998, Jade Tree assembled a double-disc Cap'n Jazz retrospective titled Analphabetapolothology which compiles the band's complete recorded works (save for Naive, their song on Achtung Chicago! Zwei): Shmap'n Shmazz, early singles, material from split releases, compilation tracks, unreleased demos and outtakes and several tracks from their farewell performance in Chicago.

The band's lineup was Tim Kinsella (vocals); Samuel Zurick (bass guitar); Mike Kinsella (drums, vocals); Victor Villarreal (guitar, vocals); and Davey von Bohlen (guitar, vocals from 1994–95).

Post-breakup and reunion

Cap'n Jazz reunited at The Empty Bottle on Friday, January 22, 2010, as part of Joan of Arc's Don't Mind Control Variety Show. After playing a short, impromptu set in Chicago, the band played its first official reunited show at the annual Forecastle Festival in Louisville on July 10, 2010, and a hometown reunion show a week later at the Bottom Lounge, supporting the vinyl re-release of Analphabetapolothology on Jade Tree Records, where they gained success. Due to the show selling out in about 48 hours, a second show was added the next night. Later, it was announced that they would also be playing reunion shows across the United States  during the summer and fall of 2010.

Most recently, Cap'n Jazz was included in the lineup for the 2017 FYF Fest in Los Angeles' Exposition Park. This marks the band's first show since 2010. The FYF appearance was followed by shows in San Francisco, Chicago, New York and London, including an appearance at Riot Fest 2017 in Chicago.

Former members of the band continue to play music, most notably in Make Believe, The Promise Ring, American Football, Owls, Ghosts and Vodka, Joan of Arc and Owen.

Influence and legacy
Cap'n Jazz have influenced a number of bands. Algernon Cadwallader has been noted for their sonic similarities to Cap'n Jazz, and have likewise cited the band as a primary influence.
The american post-hardcore band Scary Kids Scaring Kids took their name from an homonymous Cap'n Jazz song.

Members

Past members 

 Tim Kinsella – lead vocals (1989–1995, 2010, 2017)
 Mike Kinsella – drums (1989–1995, 2010, 2017)
 Davey von Bohlen – guitar, backing vocals (1993–1995, 2010)
 Victor Villarreal – guitar (1989–1995, 2010, 2017)
 Sam Zurick – bass guitar (1989–1995, 2010, 2017)

Discography

Studio albums
 Burritos, Inspiration Point, Fork Balloon Sports, Cards in the Spokes, Automatic Biographies, Kites, Kung Fu, Trophies, Banana Peels We've Slipped On and Egg Shells We've Tippy Toed Over (Also known as Shmap'n Shmazz) – LP/CD (Man With Gun Records, 1995)

Singles/EPs
 Sometimes if you stand further away from something, it does not seem as big. Sometimes you can stand so close to something you can not tell what you are looking at. – 7” (Underdog Records, 1993)
 Boys 16 to 18 Years... Age of Action – (Further Beyond Records, 1993)

Anthology
 Analphabetapolothology – 2xCD (Jade Tree Records, 1998), 2xLP (Jade Tree Records 2010)

Compilation appearances
 Achtung Chicago! Zwei! – compilation LP (Underdog Records, 1993)
 Nothing Dies with Blue Skies – 7” split w/ Friction (Shakefork Records, 1993)
 How the Midwest Was Won – compilation 2x7” (Subfusc Records, 1993) (Playing Field Recordings, 1993)
 Picking More Daisies – compilation 2x7” (Further Beyond Records, 1993)
 It’s a Punk Thing, You Wouldn't Understand – compilation LP (Shakefork Records, 1993)
 Ghost Dance – compilation 2x7” (Slave Cut Records, 1993)
 A Very Punk Christmas – compilation 2x7” (The Rocco Empire & Further Beyond Records, 1993)
 Punk TV – compilation LP (Red Dawg Records, 1995)
 We’ve Lost Beauty – compilation LP (File 13, 1995)
 Ooh Do I Love You – compilation 2xCD (Core For Care, 1995)

References

External links
 Jade Tree Records’ band page

American post-hardcore musical groups
Emo musical groups from Illinois
Musical groups from Chicago
Musical groups established in 1989
Musical groups disestablished in 1995
Jade Tree (record label) artists